This is a season-by-season list of records compiled by Northeastern in men's ice hockey.

Northeastern has sponsored varsity ice hockey since 1929 with the exception of a three-year period during World War II.

Season-by-season results

Note: GP = Games played, W = Wins, L = Losses, T = Ties

* Winning percentage is used when conference schedules are unbalanced.^ Maine was forced to forfeit 13 games after the season for using an ineligible player.

Footnotes

References

 
Lists of college men's ice hockey seasons in the United States
Northeastern Huskies ice hockey seasons